Makhdoom Fawaz Ahmed Hashmi is a Pakistani politician who had been a member of the Provincial Assembly of Punjab from October 2018 till January 2023.

Political career
Hashmi was elected to the Provincial Assembly of Punjab from the constituency PP-261 in 2018 Pakistani by-elections as a candidate of Pakistan Tehreek-e-Insaf. He defeated Makhdoom Hassan Raza Hashim of Pakistan Peoples Party. Hashmi garnered 29,526 votes while his closest rival secured 14,995 votes.

References

Living people
Pakistan Tehreek-e-Insaf politicians
Politicians from Punjab, Pakistan
Year of birth missing (living people)